Maheson Singh Tongbram (born 26 November 2004) is an Indian footballer who plays as a midfielder for RoundGlass Punjab in the I-League.

Career statistics

Club

Honours
India U20
SAFF U-20 Championship: 2022

References

2004 births
Living people
Footballers from Manipur
Indian footballers
India youth international footballers
Association football midfielders
I-League players
RoundGlass Punjab FC players